Public School 65K is a historic school building located in Cypress Hills, Brooklyn, New York, New York. It was originally built in 1870 and significantly expanded in 1889 to designs by James W. Naughton. It is a two-story, brick building on a stone base in the Romanesque Revival style.  It features a slightly projecting central tower and terra cotta decorative details.

It was listed on the National Register of Historic Places in 1981.

See also 
List of New York City Landmarks
National Register of Historic Places listings in Kings County, New York

References

Cypress Hills, Brooklyn
School buildings on the National Register of Historic Places in New York City
Public elementary schools in Brooklyn
New York City Designated Landmarks in Brooklyn
Romanesque Revival architecture in New York City
School buildings completed in 1870
National Register of Historic Places in Brooklyn